Bucu is an unincorporated community in Dickenson County, Virginia, in the United States.

History
A post office was established at Bucu in 1883, and remained in operation until it was discontinued in 1957. Bucu took its name from the brand of a popular medication.

References

Unincorporated communities in Dickenson County, Virginia
Unincorporated communities in Virginia